Mohammad Ali Ahmadi (born June 24, 1983) is an Iranian professional football player, who played for Sepahan in the Iran Pro League.

Career
Ahmadi has played his entire career for Zob Ahan

Last Update: 19 August 2014

Honours

Club
Zob Ahan
Hazfi Cup: 2008–09
Iran Pro League Runner-up: 2008–09, 2009–10
Asian Champions League Runner-up: 2010

Sepahan
Iran Pro League (1): 2014–15
Hazfi Cup: 2012–13

References

External sources
 Profile at Persianleague

Living people
Iranian footballers
Zob Ahan Esfahan F.C. players
Sepahan S.C. footballers
Persian Gulf Pro League players
1983 births
People from Kerman
Association football fullbacks
Association football central defenders
People from Kerman Province